Gods and Generals may refer to:

Gods and Generals (novel), a 1996 novel by Jeff Shaara
Gods and Generals (film), a film adaptation released in 2003
Gods and Generals (video game), a 2003 video game published alongside the film
Gods and Generals (soundtrack), the soundtrack to the 2003 film, includes an otherwise unreleased song by Bob Dylan
Gods and Generals (album), album by Civil War (band)